The Women's Flyweight (– 48 kg) Weightlifting Event is the lightest women's event at the weightlifting competition, limiting competitors to a maximum of 48 kilograms of body mass. The competition at the 2005 European Weightlifting Championships took place on 2005-04-22 in Sofia, Bulgaria.

Results

References
iat.uni-leipzig

2005 European Weightlifting Championships
Euro